The Yiong Tsangpo is a right-bank tributary of the Parlung Tsangpo in eastern Tibet Autonomous Region of China. It starts in the Nyenchen Tanglha Mountains of central Lhari County, runs 286 kilometres and empties into the Parlung Tsangpo near Tongmai of Bomê County. A tremendous Yigong landslide occurred on the Yiong Tsangpo in Bomê County on April 9, 2000. It can be called the largest and longest rapid landslide in China.

Notes

Rivers of Tibet